Henadzy Makhveyenia (born December 10, 1983), also known as Gennady Makhveyenya, is a Belarusian weightlifter. His personal best combined total is 290 kg.

At the 2006 and 2007 European Weightlifting Championships he won overall silver in the 62 kg category, both times winning gold medals in the snatch.

He competed in Weightlifting at the 2008 Summer Olympics in the 62 kg division finishing tenth, with 278 kg.

References

External links
 
 
 
 

Belarusian male weightlifters
1983 births
Living people
Weightlifters at the 2008 Summer Olympics
Olympic weightlifters of Belarus
European Weightlifting Championships medalists
People from Dubrowna District
Sportspeople from Vitebsk Region
21st-century Belarusian people